Game Titan was an American Video Game development studio that was founded in 1999 by Eric Kinkead. They were a small team primarily focused on making handheld games for the Game Boy Advance. The studio was shut down in 2005 for unknown reasons.

Games Developed
Frogger 2: Swampy's Revenge : Game Boy Color
Earthworm Jim (video game) : Game Boy Advance
Jazz Jackrabbit (2002 video game) : Game Boy Advance
Spy Kids Challenger : Game Boy Advance
The Cat in the Hat 2005 : Game Boy Advance

References

Video game companies of the United States